Anglo-Chinese Junior College (ACJC) is a junior college in Singapore that offers a two-year pre-university programme leading to the Singapore-Cambridge GCE Advanced Level examination. Established in 1977, Anglo-Chinese Junior College is the junior college arm of the Anglo-Chinese School family of Methodist schools in Singapore.

History
The history of the school dates back to 1913 when Reverend William Fitzjames Oldham saw the need for the provision of pre-university education for Anglo-Chinese School boys. As a result, the Anglo-Chinese College building project and the fund-raising initiative were started by Reverend J S Nagle, who started negotiations with the British colonial government about setting up a college to prepare students for British university education. The proposal was turned down by the government, who decided in favour of establishing Raffles College to commemorate the centenary of the founding of Singapore.

In 1970 the ACS Board of Governors submitted their recommendations for a junior college to the Singapore government. A 6-hectare site at Rochester Park on a 30-year lease was given for the construction of the college. Thus, on 3 January 1977, Anglo-Chinese Junior College became the fifth junior college to be established in line with the Ministry of Education's policy on pre-university education, equivalent to a British Sixth-form college, and welcoming 968 students in Pre-U 1 and Pre-U 2. To start with, it was an all-male institution. Its main complex was equipped with three lecture theatres, a library, the Tan Chin Tuan Auditorium and eight laboratories. The Shaw Sports Complex housed a 400-metre bitumen track, tennis, volleyball, basketball and sepak takraw courts.

In 1986, an expansion of the college was proposed and approved by the Ministry of Education three years later. The extension included a new four-storey Library Block to contain the Oldham Library on two levels, two lecture theatres and two micro-computer laboratories. A multi-purpose void deck was built under the extension for events to be held in the college. A new 8-lane 400m track and soccer field with floodlighting capacity was also included. This phase was completed in 1991 and cost $3.5 million.

On 1 March 1992, the college's Founder's Day, the ACJC Sports Complex started construction. The complex contains two swimming pools, a gymnasium, badminton courts and billiard facilities. A multi-purpose hall was also built in the complex, together with a lounge, dance studios, and a Heritage Room where trophies and memorabilia are showcased. The Complex also houses a cafe on the pool deck. $500,000 for the complex were raised through the college's annual carnival, Fun-O-Rama, and other carnivals.
In line with MOE's requirements, such as IT-enabled facilities, a major renovation was planned for the college. In 1999, the College Upgrading Project was started at a total cost of $21 million. The main block was refurbished and a 600-seat lecture theatre and viewing gallery built, with a concourse linking it to the lobby of the building. An Oldham Wing and covered walkways to all parts of the campus were built. The renovations was completed by December 2002.

The Anglo-Chinese Junior College Center for Performing Arts is the main venue for performing arts programmes at ACJC. Commissioned in May 2008, it hosts a fully equipped theatre, a black box, a dance studio and other places for the performing arts. The CPA is home to many of the College's musical and theatrical productions, and the facilities are also available for use by the community.

School identity and culture
Anglo-Chinese Junior College is a Methodist institution committed to an all-rounded education based on Christian principles and consciousness of others, self and God.

Corporal punishment 
The long-standing ACS "family tradition" of corporal punishment - using caning to discipline misbehaving male students - was adopted by Anglo-Chinese Junior College in initial years. However, ACJC practice was to deliver the strokes privately in the principal's room, whereas canings at ACS were administered in front of the student body. In one case in 1987, seven ACJC students were caned for stealing audio equipment from the college. This form of punishment is no longer used in ACJC.

Fun-O-Rama
This biennial fundraiser is a funfair, where students and teachers set up booths for games or for the sale of food and memorabilia. Attractions include the haunted houses and the dunking station in which prominent members of the student body and the faculty participate. Alumni of the school tend to be the largest supporters of the event.

The Fun-O-Rama involves the entire school and its alumni (as well as the entire ACS family), and the funds it has generated over the years have helped the college build a sports complex, as well as giving the entire premises a facelift, including new extensions and buildings. Besides the primary aim of raising funds, Fun-O-Rama helps bond the classes as they embark on their fund-raising projects.

Fun-O-Rama was held on 29 March 2008, 27 March 2010, 24 March 2012, 2 April 2016, and 25 March 2018.

Due to COVID-19, the Fun-o-Rama XXV which was initially planned to be held on 28 March 2020 was postponed until further notice.

Achievements

Performing arts

Choir
The ACJC Choir is the four-time winner of the Singapore Youth Festival Choir of the Year award (1997, 1995, 1993, 1989) and holder of the Best Junior College Choir title (2003, 2001, 1997, 1995). In 2005 the choir was awarded the Gold with Honours award in the Singapore Youth Festival, giving a near-monopoly of the nation's highest choral awards from 1989 to 2005. The Choir achieved the Gold award at the 2007 SYF Central Judging and the Gold with Honours awards at the 2009 and 2011 SYF Judging.

The Choir participates in overseas competitions and tours. It first gained international exposure on a choral tour to Japan in 1989. Since then it has toured South Korea (1990) and the United States (1993), where it performed at the headquarters of the United Nations and the White House. The Choir was invited by the International Federation for Choral Music to perform at the 4th World Symposium on Choral Music in Sydney, Australia in 1996. It remains the only Singaporean choir to have been invited to the event.

Since 1997 the Choir has won international competitions in Sweden, Finland, the Netherlands, the Czech Republic, and Slovakia. In 2006 the ACJC Choir competed at the Llangollen International Eisteddfod in Wales and came second in the Youth Category and first in the Mixed Category.

In June 2008 the ACJC Choir emerged as the only choir with three Gold medals at the 3rd Festa Choralis International Choir Competition in Bratislava, Slovakia. The only Asian choir at the competition, it competed alongside choirs from Poland, Great Britain, the Czech Republic, Russia and Slovakia in the Mixed Choir (Adult), Youth Choir (up to 19 years old) and Folk Song Categories. In all three categories, the ACJC Choir won gold medals with top marks and was the only choir in the competition to whom the adjudicators awarded a perfect score of 100 points.

The Choir organises the annual concert An Evening With Friends, and performs regularly at community and ministerial events.

Drama
ACSian Theatre has been active in the performing arts scene, and has put up numerous plays and productions for the college and at competitions. As early as 1985, productions such as Billy Liar and The Hound of the Baskervilles were staged. Some productions to date include Amadeus, The Crucible, The Joy Luck Club, Grease, Fame and Camelot. Recent productions include West Side Story (2007), Pride and Prejudice (2008) and The Odyssey (2009). ACSian Theatre has also garnered several Gold awards at the SYF Central Judging, including several Play of the Year titles. Its most recent achievement at the SYF Central Judging is an accomplishment in 2018.

Dance
The ACJC Dance Society achieved its first Gold with Honours award at the Singapore Youth Festival Central Judging Competition 2007 with the item "Hiya Bob! A Tribute To Fosse". This featured many works of Bob Fosse, such as "Cabaret" and "Sing Sing Sing!". The ACJC Dance Society has also performed at many events such as the ASEAN Ministerial Meeting in 2007. The society also stages an annual performance "Restless", first performed in 2003.

Guitar Ensemble
The ACJC Guitar Ensemble, since its inception in 2007, has risen quickly to be a prominent CCA in the college. It has garnered several awards at the Singapore Youth Festival Central Judging (before 2012) and Art Presentations (from 2013): Gold with Honours (2007), Gold (2009), Silver (2011) and a Certificate of Distinction (2013). The ensemble organises two annual concerts - Glissando in May and A Christmas Story in December, to raise funds for its adopted charity, Club Rainbow.

Sports
ACJC is a traditional sporting powerhouse and is strong in bowling, rugby, softball, swimming, water polo, badminton, golf, billiards, netball, air rifle, football, squash, tennis and track and field.

The ACJC cross-country team was successful in the national schools' championships for 2001, 2002 and 2003 for the boys' team. The girls' team won the championship in 1999 and has consistently emerged among the top 3 teams since. In 2002 and 2003, the boys' team won individual champions. Its latest win in the national inter-school cross-country championships was in 2007.

In rugby, ACJC has held the 'A' Division title since 2000 but lost it to longtime rival Raffles Junior College in 2004. In 2005 the title was finally regained by ACJC. Waterpolo has also resulted in numerous wins for the college.

In bowling, ACJC has extended its dominance in the girls category, having retained the 'A' division title since 2018, with a historic clean sweep of all the medals in 2021. The boys team has also constantly emerged top 3 since their last win in 2015, finishing 2nd in the 2022 National School Games.

National inter-schools championships

Air Pistol
Boys:
Girls: 2007, 2013
Air Rifle
Boys: 1994, 1996
Girls:
Badminton
Boys: 1990, 1992, 2000, 2002, 2011
Girls: 1993, 2007
Bowling
Boys: 1996, 1997, 1998, 1999, 2000, 2003, 2008, 2013, 2015
Girls: 1997, 1999, 2000, 2009, 2013, 2014, 2015, 2016, 2018, 2019, 2021, 2022
Canoeing
Boys: 2008
Girls: 1993, 1994, 2008
Golf
Boys: 2003, 2005, 2006, 2007, 2008, 2014, 2015
Girls: 2010, 2014
Hockey
Boys:
Girls: 1994, 1997, 1998
Netball
Girls: 2005, 2009, 2010, 2011, 2012, 2013, 2018, 2019

Rugby
Boys: 1997, 1999, 2001, 2002, 2003, 2005
Softball
Girls: 2013, 2015, 2017, 2018, 2019
Tennis
Boys: 2003, 2004, 2006
Girls:
Track & Field
Boys: 1996, 1997, 2000, 2001, 2003
Girls:
Squash
Boys: 2002
Girls: 1990, 2001, 2003, 2017
Swimming
Boys: 1993, 1995, 1996, 1997, 2000, 2001, 2003
Girls: 1989, 1992, 1993, 1998, 1999
Volleyball
Girls: 2013
Boys: 2018
Water-Polo
Boys: 1991, 1992, 1994, 1996, 1998, 1999, 2000, 2001, 2002, 2005, 2013, 2014, 2015
X-Country
Boys: 2001, 2002, 2003, 2006, 2007
Girls: 1999

Academics
ACJC received the Academic Value-Added Achievement Award in 2005 and 2006. This award is given to schools that have been most effective in achieving improvement in their students. Improvement is measured by comparing the students' expected GCE A-Level results (based on GCE O-Level results attained) with the actual A-level results achieved. ACJC has also produced a number of scholars in recent years, including:
President's Scholars
Singapore Armed Forces Scholars
Singapore Police Force Scholars
Overseas Merit Scholars
Institute of Physics Singapore Gold Medallists
Lee Kuan Yew Award for Mathematics and Science
Angus Ross Prize
Prime Minister's Book Prize
MOE Humanities/Pre-University/Music Elective Scholars
ASEAN/SIA-Youth Scholars

ACJC is affiliated with all Methodist schools in Singapore, including ACS (Barker Road), ACS (Independent), Methodist Girls' School, Fairfield Methodist School (Secondary), Fairfield Methodist School (Primary), Geylang Methodist Secondary School, Paya Lebar Methodist Girls' School (Primary) and Paya Lebar Methodist Girls' School (Secondary)

See also 
 Anglo-Chinese School
 Anglo-Chinese School (Barker Road)
 Anglo-Chinese School (Independent)
 Anglo-Chinese School (International)

References

External links
Official website
ACJC X-Country unofficial site (Archived 2009-10-25)

Anglo-Chinese School
Junior colleges in Singapore
Methodist schools
 
Educational institutions established in 1977
Queenstown, Singapore
Dover, Singapore
1977 establishments in Singapore